VSI Berlin GmbH  is a German language service provider with dubbing studios and subtitling facilities, based in the historical Osthafen area in central Berlin.

History

In 2005, the British language service provider, Voice & Script International Ltd, opened up a branch in Germany, offering subtitling and voice-over facilities in the centre of Berlin. In 2007, it expanded its services by adding a German dubbing division,. In 2011, both companies merged to form VSI Berlin GmbH.

Under the leadership of Ulrike Schubert and Norman Dawood,, the company offers dubbing, voice-over and subtitling of multilingual projects, as well as preparation of broadcast material, video editing and access services for television. 

VSI Berlin GmbH is part of the VSI Group, which consists of 21 studios and production facilities worldwide.

See also 

 vidby
 NeoSpeech
 Duolingo

References

External links 
Official Website

Companies based in Berlin
Dubbing studios
Translation companies